Ruth Marianna Handler ( Mosko; November 4, 1916 – April 27, 2002) was an American businesswoman and inventor. Best known for inventing the Barbie doll in 1959, she served as the first president of toy manufacturer Mattel, Inc., which she co-founded with her husband in January 1945 until 1974 when the Handlers were forced to resign from Mattel, and in 1978 Ruth Handler was convicted of false reporting to the Securities and Exchange Commission.

Early life
Handler was born Ruth Marianna Mosko in Denver, Colorado, to Polish-Jewish immigrants Ida Mosko (née Rubenstein) and Jacob Mosko. She married her high school boyfriend, Elliot Handler, and moved to Los Angeles in 1938.  Her husband decided to make their furniture out of two newfound types of plastics, Lucite and Plexiglas. Ruth Handler suggested that he start doing this commercially and they began a furniture business. Ruth Handler worked as the sales force for the new business, landing contracts with Douglas Aircraft Company and others.

Formation of Mattel

Origin 
As Ruth continued with her job at Paramount, Elliot tried his hand at a hobby of furniture making.  With her husband's successful usage of two new plastics (Lucite and Plexiglas) in the making of various pieces of furniture, Ruth saw the potential for an entrepreneurial endeavor.  With him as the brains behind the design and her as the sales force, the two created Mattel, combining Elliot's first name with that of their newfound partner, Harold "Matt" Matson.  Following a dry spell within the furniture making industry, the Handlers began a stint within the plastic toy furniture manufacturer during World War II.  With their newfound success, Ruth and Elliott believed that Mattel had the potential to move in a different direction.

Barbie

Two stories are often cited as Handler's inspiration for the Barbie doll. The first details a trip to Europe with her husband and children, during which she saw a doll that looked like a woman (which was vastly different from the typical baby dolls that many girls owned at the time). The other discusses a singular moment, in which Ruth witnessed her daughter Barbara playing with paper dolls in their home. Afterwards, Handler wanted to create a more realistic, 3D toy that represented what these girls "wanted to be". While the timeline of/truth behind these stories has never been fully confirmed, Ruth pushed Mattel for the release of what was to be known as the Barbie doll (named after her daughter Barbara).

Premiering at the American Toy Fair in New York City on March 9, 1959, Barbie was an instant success. Girls clamored for the doll, and Mattel sold 351,000 dolls within their first year. Ruth even negotiated a deal for the dolls to be advertised as the sole sponsors of the Mickey Mouse Club, and Barbie was the first toy to successfully be advertised directly to children. Soon after, they would add a boyfriend for Barbie named Ken, after the Handlers' son, and many other characters that would complete Barbie's world. While Barbie has faced its fair share of controversy over the years, having to do with everything from the doll's “questionable intelligence” and hourglass physique to the introduction of the Ken doll in the 1960s as her "handsome steady,” Barbie's allure has rarely faded, and today, Mattel has sold over 1 billion dolls, all with a series of personas from astronaut to businesswoman to UNICEF volunteer and beyond. In addition to the success of its dolls, Barbie has become a corporation, spanning a series of movies, TV shows, video games, celebrity collaborations, and essentially finding success in almost any form of media.

Later years
Handler was diagnosed with breast cancer in 1970. To combat this, she had a modified radical mastectomy, which was often used at the time to combat the disease. Due to difficulties in finding a good breast prosthesis, Handler decided to make her own. With the help of new business partner Peyton Massey, and under her new company Ruthton Corp., Handler manufactured a more realistic version of a woman's breast, called "Nearly Me". This invention became quite popular, and then-first lady Betty Ford was personally fitted for one. 

Following the success of Ruthton Corp. and several investigations of producing fraudulent financial reports, Handler resigned from Mattel in 1974. Investigations did continue after her resignation, and, in 1978, Handler was charged with fraud and false reporting to the U.S. Securities and Exchange Commission. She pleaded no contest, and was fined US$57,000 and sentenced to 2,500 hours of community service. She blamed her illness for making her "unfocused" on her business.

Handler died in California from complications of surgery for colon cancer on April 27, 2002, aged 85. Her husband Elliot died nine years later at the age of 95.

References

Further reading

 Forman-Brunell, Miriam. "Barbie in" LIFE": The Life of Barbie." Journal of the History of Childhood and Youth 2.3 (2009): 303-311. online
 Gerber, Robin. Barbie and Ruth: The Story of the World's Most Famous Doll and the Woman Who Created Her. Harper/Collins, 2008.
 Weissman, Kristin Noelle. Barbie: The Icon, the Image, the Ideal: An Analytical Interpretation of the Barbie Doll in Popular Culture (1999).
 Wepman, Dennis. "Handler, Ruth" American National Biography (2000) online

External links

1916 births
2002 deaths
20th-century American inventors
American chief executives of manufacturing companies
American people of Polish-Jewish descent
American retail chief executives
American toy industry businesspeople
American women chief executives
Barbie
Businesspeople from Denver
Businesspeople from Los Angeles
Mattel people
Toy inventors
Women inventors
Burials at Hillside Memorial Park Cemetery